William Joseph Knecht (March 10, 1930 – December 17, 1992) was an American competition rower. He took up the sport at La Salle University, and later went to Villanova University, graduating in 1951. In 1946, he joined the Vesper Boat Club and won multiple national titles with them. Internationally, he earned gold medals in the eights at the 1955 Pan American Games and 1964 Olympics, and in double sculls at the 1959 and 1963 Pan American Games. He also took part in the double sculls event at the 1960 Olympics, paired with John B. Kelly Jr., but failed to reach the final due to a sudden illness.

In his school years, Knecht was an avid basketball and football player. He was a lifelong friend of Kelly, both being godfathers of each other's sons. By the time of 1964 Olympics Knecht had six children and ran a sheet metal business. He later became a member of the U.S. Olympic Rowing Team Committee, a judge at the 1992 Summer Olympics, and the founder of the Cooper River Rowing Association. He was inducted into the American Rowing Hall of Fame. The annual Knecht Cup Regatta is hosted by the Villanova University in his honor.

References

Cited sources

1930 births
1992 deaths
Rowers at the 1960 Summer Olympics
Rowers at the 1964 Summer Olympics
Olympic gold medalists for the United States in rowing
American male rowers
Medalists at the 1964 Summer Olympics
Pan American Games medalists in rowing
Pan American Games gold medalists for the United States
Rowers at the 1955 Pan American Games
Rowers at the 1959 Pan American Games
Rowers at the 1963 Pan American Games
European Rowing Championships medalists
Medalists at the 1955 Pan American Games
Medalists at the 1959 Pan American Games
Medalists at the 1963 Pan American Games